In probability theory and statistics, the raised cosine distribution is a continuous probability distribution supported on the interval . The probability density function (PDF) is

The cumulative distribution function (CDF) is

The moments of the raised cosine distribution are somewhat complicated in the general case, but are considerably simplified for the standard raised cosine distribution. Because the standard raised cosine distribution is an even function, the odd moments are zero. The even moments are given by:

 

where  is a generalized hypergeometric function.

See also 
 Hann function
 Havercosine (hvc)

References 

Continuous distributions